Straightaways is the second release of the band Son Volt. It was released on April 22, 1997.

Track listing
All songs written by Jay Farrar except where indicated.

 "Caryatid Easy" - 4:43
 "Back into Your World" - 3:43
 "Picking Up the Signal" - 3:45
 "Left a Slide" - 5:10
 "Creosote" - 4:10
 "Cemetery Savior" - 3:12
 "Last Minute Shakedown" - 4:03
 "Been Set Free" (Jay Farrar, Monica Farrar) - 4:33
 "No More Parades" - 3:19
 "Way Down Watson" - 3:42

Personnel
 Jay Farrar - guitars, lead vocals, organ, harmonica
 Dave Boquist - guitars, fiddle, banjo, lap steel guitar
 Eric Heywood - pedal steel guitar, mandolin
 Jim Boquist - bass, backing vocals
 Mike Heidorn - drums
 Pauli Ryan - tambourine

References

Son Volt albums
1997 albums
Warner Records albums